B.D. Arts College is a college for women situated in Ahmedabad in Gujarat state in India.Set up in 1956 the college offers undergraduate and postgraduate courses in the arts .

References

Universities and colleges in Ahmedabad
Women's universities and colleges in Gujarat
Arts colleges in India